David Gordon Evans (born 20 May 1958) is an English retired professional footballer who made more than 500 league appearances for three clubs.

Career
Born in West Bromwich, Evans began his professional career with Aston Villa. He later played for Halifax Town in two spells, and also played with Bradford City. Whilst at Bradford he won the Football League Division Three title in 1984–85; on the last day of that season he was involved in the Valley Parade fire disaster.

References

1958 births
Living people
English footballers
Aston Villa F.C. players
Bradford City A.F.C. players
Halifax Town A.F.C. players
English Football League players
Brighouse Town F.C. players
Association football defenders